Lim Soo Hoon is the first female Permanent Secretary of Singapore in the Public Service Division of the office of the Prime Minister of Singapore. Lim held other high-profile positions at Singapore's Ministry of Trade and Industry, then later into positions in Singapore's Ministry of Transport, and then in the Ministry of Manpower, and Ministry of Community Development, Youth and Sports.  Lim became Singapore's Woman of the Year in 1997.

Lim was awarded the Silver Public Administration Medal in 1998 and the Gold Public Administration Medal in 2004.

Lim has served in the public sector for 36 years, her final position being the Permanent Secretary at the Ministry of Finance before retirement.

Lim will continue working as chairman of the Accounting and Corporate Regulatory Authority (Acra) Board.

References

Further reading
Chuan, Calis. Committed to CHANGE: Interview with PS (PSD) Lim Soo Hoon, Personalities, Challenge, August 2006.
Balancing Act, Interview with Lim Soo Hoon, Permanent Secretary, Public Service Division (Singapore) and Tan Ching Yee, Permanent Secretary, Ministry of Education (Singapore), Challenge, 2007.

Singaporean people of Chinese descent
Singaporean civil servants
Permanent secretaries of Singapore
Recipients of the Pingat Pentadbiran Awam
21st-century Singaporean women